Conne River Water Aerodrome  is located  southwest of Conne River, Newfoundland and Labrador, Canada.

References

Registered aerodromes in Newfoundland and Labrador
Seaplane bases in Newfoundland and Labrador